General Güemes Department may refer to:

General Güemes Department, Chaco
General Güemes Department, Salta in Salta Province

Department name disambiguation pages